The University of Tromsø – The Arctic University of Norway (Norwegian: Universitetet i Tromsø – Norges arktiske universitet; Northern Sami: Romssa universitehta – Norgga árktalaš universitehta) is a state university in Norway and the world's northernmost university. Located in the city of Tromsø, Norway, it was established by an act of parliament in 1968, and opened in 1972. It is one of ten universities in Norway. The University of Tromsø is the largest research and educational institution in Northern Norway and the sixth-largest university in Norway. The university's location makes it a natural venue for the development of studies of the region's natural environment, culture, and society.

The main focus of the university's activities is on auroral light research, space science, fishery science, biotechnology, linguistics, multicultural societies, Saami culture, telemedicine, epidemiology and a wide spectrum of Arctic research projects. The close vicinity of the Norwegian Polar Institute, the Norwegian Institute of Marine Research and the Polar Environmental Centre gives Tromsø added weight and importance as an international centre for Arctic research. Research activities, however, are not limited to Arctic studies. The university researchers work within a broad range of subjects and are recognised both nationally and internationally.

On 1 January 2009, the University of Tromsø merged with Tromsø University College. On 1 August 2013, the university merged with Finnmark University College to form Universitetet i Tromsø – Norges arktiske universitet (The University of Tromsø – The Arctic University of Norway), thereby adding campuses in Alta, Hammerfest and Kirkenes. On 1 January 2016, Narvik University College and Harstad University College merged with UiT - The Arctic University of Norway. As of January 2016 the university now has six campus locations in northern Norway, the main campus being Tromsø.

Faculties and other units
The university is primarily divided into five faculties with multiple subordinate departments and several associated centres.

 Faculty of Biosciences, Fisheries and Economics
Department of Arctic and Marine Biology
The Norwegian College of Fishery Science
School of Business and Economics
 Norwegian College of Fishery Science
Faculty of Engineering Science and Technology
Department of Industrial Engineering
Department of Building, Energy and Material Technology
Department of Automation and Process Engineering
Department of Computer Science and Computational Engineering
Department of Electrical Engineering
Faculty of Health Sciences
 Department of Medical Biology
 Department of Community Medicine
 Department of Clinical Medicine
 Department of Pharmacy
 Department of Clinical Dentistry
 Department of Psychology
 Department of Health and Care Sciences
 School of sport sciences
 Department of Social Education
Faculty of Humanities, Social Sciences and Education
 The Barents Institute
 Centre for Women's and Gender Research
 Centre for Peace Studies, Tromsø (CPS)
 Department of Tourism and Northern Studies
 Centre for Sami Studies
 Department of Archaeology, History, Religious Studies and Theology
 Department of Philosophy
 Department of History and Religious Studies
 Department of Culture and Literature
 Department of Education
 Department of Language and Linguistics
 Center for Advanced Study in Theoretical Linguistics
 Department of Social Sciences
 Department of Language and Culture
 Department of Child Welfare and Social Work
Faculty of Law
Norwegian Centre for the Law of the Sea
The Arctic University Museum of Norway and the Academy of Arts
The Arctic University Museum of Norway
Conservatory of Music
Academy of Arts
Faculty of Science and Technology
Department of Chemistry
Department of Computer Science
Department of Geosciences
Department of Mathematics and Statistics
Department of Physics and Technology
Department of Technology and Safety
Tromsø School of Aviation
Lie-Størmer Center for fundamental structures in computational and pure mathematics
 The University Library

Buildings & architecture

Campus Tromsø

Administration building, 1989 (John Kristoffersen Arkitektkontor AS)
Arctic Biology building, 1993 (Arkitektkontoret Amundsen AS)
Ardna
Breivang building, 1951 / renovated 2016 (Arkitektkontoret Amundsen AS)
Breivika III, 1983 (Arkitektkontoret Dalsbøe & Østgaard AS / Borealis Arkitekter AS)
Exact Sciences (Realfag) building, 1978 (John Kristoffersen Arkitektkontor)
Lower and Uppper Gazebo buildings (Nedre og Øvre Lysthus), 1991 (Blå strek arkitekter AS)
Medical and Health Faculty building, 1991 (Borealis Arkitekter AS & John Kristoffersen Arkitektkontor AS)
Museum Botanical Unit (Kvaløyvegen 30), built in 1952 as aquarium (Reidar Kolstrand), taken by museum in 1959, converted to Marine biology station in 1982 (Eigill Hallset), rebuilt and restored in 1999.
Natural Sciences (Naturfag) building, 1974, extended 1988, restored and rebuilt 2003 (A2-arkitektkontor AS, by architect MNAL Øyvind Ragde, Aall & Løkeland AS Redevelopment: Paul Pincus, Borealis AS)
Norwegian College of Fishery Science, 1994 (Steinsvik Arkitektkontor AS)
Northern Lights Observatory, 1971 (Terje Jacobsen & Eigill Hallset)
Northern Lights Planetarium / Science Centre of Northern Norway, 1989 (John Kristoffersen Arkitektkontor AS)
Operations Centre, 1985 (Arkitektkontoret Dalsbøe & Østgaard AS)
Pharmacy Building, 1998 (Borealis Arkitekter AS)
Polar Museum
Theoretical Subjects (Teorifag) building, Houses 1-6, 2004 (Telje-Torp-Aasen Arkitektkontor AS)
Tromsø University Museum, 1961 (Blakstad & Munthe-Kaas Arkitektkontor, Oslo)
University Library, 1981 (Arkitektkontoret Dalsbøe & Østgaard AS in cooperation with Ark. MNAL Leif Olav Moen)

Honorary doctors

 Mari Boine, Norway (2018)
 Olav Holt, Norway (2018)
 Richard Horton, UK (2018)
 Arieh Warshel, US (2018)
 Laila Stien, Norway (2015)
 Trond Mohn, Norway (2015)
 Oran R. Young, US (2015)
 Jonas Gahr Støre, Norway (2011)
 Sergey Lavrov, Russia (2011)
 Narve Bjørgo, Norway (2008)
 Ole Henrik Magga, Norway (2008)
 Barbara Neis, Canada (2008)
 Steven Pinker, US (2008)
 Johan P. Olsen, Norway (2006)
 Jan Raa, Norway (2006)
 Rodolfo Stavenhagen, Mexico (2006)
 Ottar Brox, Norway (2003)
 Erica I.A. Daes, Greece (2003)
 Tor Hagfors, Norway (2003)
 Nawal el-Saadawi, Egypt (2003)
 Tenzin Gyatso, the 14th Dalai Lama, Tibet (2001)
 Mordechai Vanunu, Israel (2001)
 William Nygaard, Norway (1998)
 Salman Rushdie, UK (1998)
 Mikhail Gorbachev, Russia (1998)
 Robert Paine, Canada (1998) 
 Susanne Romaine, UK (1998)
 Rigoberta Menchú Tum, Guatemala (1996)
 Carsten Smith, Norway (1995)
 Desmond Mpilo Tutu, South Africa (1994)
 Jørn Dyerberg, Denmark (1993)
 Torstein Bertelsen, Norway (1993)
 Georg Henrik von Wright, Finland (1993)
 Ragnhild Sundby, Norway (1993)
 Helga Marie Hernes, Norway (1993)
 Parzival Copes, Canada (1993)
 Amy van Marken, Netherlands (1987)
 Kjell Bondevik, Norway (1982)
 Peter F. Hjort, Norway (1982)

Notable employees

Nils Jernsletten (born 1934), professor of Sámi and editor of Sámi newspaper Ságat (1964–1966)
Jelena Porsanger (born 1967), Russian Sami ethnographer, university rector

Notable alumni

 Monica Kristensen Solås (born 1950), glaciologist, meteorologist, polar explorer and crime novelist
 Svein-Erik Hamran (born 1960), led the development of the RIMFAX for the Mars rover Perseverance
 Sandra Márjá West (born 1990), politician and festival manager of Riddu Riđđu
 Marianne Haukland (born 1989), politician and member of the Standing Committee on Family and Cultural Affairs

Logo
The ravens in the university's logo are Huginn and Muninn. In Norse mythology, Hugin and Munin travel the world for Odin, bringing him news and information. Huginn represents thought and Muninn memory. Ravens are an early Norse symbol, used, for example, on the raven banner.

See also
 Open access in Norway

References

External links
 University of Tromsø
 Faculty of Health Sciences, University of Tromsø

Tromso
Education and research in Tromsø
Educational institutions established in 1968
1968 establishments in Norway
Universities and colleges formed by merger in Norway